Live Bait is a 1997 live album of the Canadian comedy music group The Arrogant Worms.  It features concert versions of some of the songs from their previous releases plus some new material.

Track listing
 "Jesus' Brother Bob"
 "The Mountie Song"
 "Canada's Really Big"
 "Me Like Hockey"
 "Proud to be Canadian"
 "Malcolm"
 "TV Weather Guy"
 "The Ballad of Dan"
 "Car Full of Pain"
 "Mounted Animal Nature Trail"
 "Carrot Juice is Murder"
 "The Last Saskatchewan Pirate"

The Arrogant Worms albums
1997 live albums